Ivo Ferreira (born September 1975) is a Portuguese film director, screenwriter and actor. His 2016 film Letters from War was shown at the 66th Berlin International Film Festival.

Selected filmography
 Letters from War (2016)
 Equinócio (2018)
 Empire Hotel (2018)

References

External links

1975 births
Living people
Portuguese film directors
Portuguese screenwriters
Male screenwriters
Portuguese male film actors
People from Lisbon
21st-century Portuguese male actors
Male actors from Lisbon
Date of birth missing (living people)